Starodubtsev is a surname. Notable people with the surname include:

 Dmitry Starodubtsev (born 1986), Russian pole-vaulter
 Vasily Starodubtsev (1931–2011), Soviet and Russian politician

Russian-language surnames